Peter Hancock (born 1955) is a British Anglican bishop

Peter Hancock may also refer to:

 Peter Hancock (businessman), former president and chief executive officer of AIG
 Peter Hancock (footballer) (1931–2020), Australian rules footballer
 Peter Hancock (professor) (born 1953), British-American scientist of human factors and ergonomics